The British Military Administration (BMA) was the interim administrator of British Borneo between the end of the Second World War and the establishment of the Crown Colonies of Sarawak and North Borneo in 1946. Specifically, the entity lasted from 12 September 1945 to 1 July 1946. Labuan became the headquarters of BMA. The headquarters was mostly managed by the Australian Imperial Force (AIF).

The area under this administration comprises today of Labuan, Sabah, Sarawak and Brunei.

Sarawak was administered by Australians under British Borneo Civil Affairs Unit (BBCAU).

See also 
 British Military Administration (Malaya)
 Japanese occupation of British Borneo

References

Further reading 
 Lists of Archival Materials from Public Record Office, London. (1886–1969)
 British military administration British Borneo : Monthly Reports

British Borneo
British Malaya in World War II
Borneo
Former countries in Bruneian history
Former countries in Malaysian history
Borneo
Military history of Malaya during World War II
Political history of Malaysia
1945 in British Malaya
1946 in British Malaya
1945 in military history
1946 in military history
States and territories established in 1945
States and territories disestablished in 1946
Borneo
Borneo
Military history of the British Empire and Commonwealth in World War II
South-East Asian theatre of World War II